Netherton is a village and civil parish in the English county of Northumberland. The population of the village at the 2011 census was 185.

Historically it was part of the parish of Alwinton of which it formed the townships of Netherton Northside and Netherton Southside.

The village's public house, the Star Inn, has its interior included in the National Inventory of Historic Pub Interiors by CAMRA. It was listed in the first 40 editions of the CAMRA Good Beer Guide from 1974 until 2013, being one of only 7 pubs to achieve this.

There is a First School (Now Closed).

References

Villages in Northumberland
Civil parishes in Northumberland